Triathlon at the 2018 Summer Youth Olympics was held from 7 to 11 October. The events took place at Parque Tres de Febrero in Buenos Aires, Argentina.

Qualification

Each National Olympic Committee (NOC) can enter a maximum of 2 competitors, 1 per each gender. As hosts, Argentina was given the maximum quota and a further 4, 2 in each gender was decided by the Tripartite Commission. The remaining 58 places shall be decided by qualification events, namely five continental qualification tournaments.

To be eligible to participate at the Youth Olympics athletes must have been born between 1 January 2001 and 31 December 2002.

The second female tripartie spot was not awarded and thus it was reallocated to the Americas, as per the qualification system.

Schedule
The schedule is expected to be released by the Buenos Aires Youth Olympic Games Organizing Committee.

All times are ART (UTC-3)

Medal summary

Medal table

Events

References

External links
Official Results Book – Triathlon

 
2018 Summer Youth Olympics events
Youth Summer Olympics
2018